Dawit Isaak (born 28 October 1964) is a Swedish-Eritrean playwright, journalist and writer who has been held in prison in Eritrea since 2001 without trial and is considered a traitor by the Eritrean government. Amnesty International considers him a prisoner of conscience and has called for his immediate and unconditional release. For years, he was the only Swedish citizen held as a prisoner of conscience (he is now joined by the Swedish citizen and publicist Gui Minhai).

Asylum and Swedish citizenship 
Isaak came to Sweden in August 1987, where he settled in the west coast city of Gothenburg and became a Swedish citizen on 4 November 1992. When Eritrea gained independence, Isaak returned to his native country, married and had children. He began working as a reporter for the country's first independent newspaper, Setit. Eventually, he became a part-owner of the newspaper.

Imprisonment 
On 23 September 2001, Isaak was arrested in his home in Asmara, Eritrea. At the same time, ten other independent journalists and eleven prominent reformist politicians of the so-called G-15 were arrested, ostensibly for demanding democratic reforms in a series of letters to President Isayas Afeworki. The independent press, including the Setit newspaper, had covered the confrontation between the president and the reformers.

In April 2002, CPJ, the Committee to Protect Journalists, reported that Isaak was hospitalized due to torture. The Eritrean government denied that he has been tortured, but did not allow anyone to visit him. Isaak had not been tried before a court. Because he held dual Swedish and Eritrean citizenship, Swedish authorities began working for his release, using "silent diplomacy" according to government sources.

On 19 November 2005, Isaak was released from jail, and according to official Eritrean sources, he was released only to see a doctor. After only two days of freedom, and while on his way to the hospital, Isaak was imprisoned again. He is believed to be held in Carchele prison in central Asmara.

Every week, a number of organizations, including Reporters Without Borders and the National Press Club, petition the Eritrean Embassy in Stockholm to free Isaak.

On 27 March 2009, four of the five largest newspapers in Sweden, Aftonbladet, Expressen, Dagens Nyheter and Svenska Dagbladet, featured a plea for the release of Isaak on their front pages. In addition, the five newspapers will feature joint reports on Isaak's situation, and a joint petition was handed over to the Eritrean Embassy in Stockholm on 4 May. By 4 May, 209,963 people had signed the petition.

On 26 May 2009, during an interview with the Swedish TV4 (channel 4) the president of Eritrea dismissed the case altogether with the words "We will not have any trial and we will not free him. We know how to handle his kind." and "To me, Sweden is irrelevant. The Swedish government has nothing to do with us."

The "silent diplomacy" method that the Swedish authorities have employed to work for Isaak's release has been criticized by the Swedish media, and the president of the Swedish branch of Reporters Without Borders, Jesper Bengtsson, issued a statement in April 2010, saying that "[i]t is a disgrace that Dawit remains in prison and it is remarkable that the Swedish government does not try harder to get him released."

After the release of the Albanian-American pilot James Berisha, the 1st Deputy Prime Minister of Kosovo, Behgjet Pacolli, will start a new mission in Eritrea for the release of Isaak.

Rumors about death 
On several occasions, rumors have circulated that Isaak is no longer alive, the most recent of which was on 27 October 2011, his 47th birthday, when Swedish commercial radio channel "Radio 1" claimed that Dawit Isaak could well be dead. In April 2012, rumours of his death once again began circulating when several Eritrean politicians stated that he had died in prison. When a government official from Eritrea was confronted about the rumours during an interview in Sweden, he avoided the question and refused to answer.

Awards 
 On 2 March 2007, Isaak was awarded a newly established prize, dedicated to the memory of Anna Politkovskaya and awarded by the Swedish National Press Club. 
 In 2009 Isaak was awarded the Kurt-Tucholsky-Prize by the Swedish P.E.N.-Association.
 He was awarded the Norwegian "Ytringsfrihetsprisen", the Freedom of Expression Prize for 2009, at the annual meeting of the Norwegian Authors' Union on 14 March 2010.
 In October 2011 Isaak received the Golden Pen of Freedom Award of the World Association of Newspapers. The award was handed over in Vienna to his brother Esias Isaak.
 In March 2017 he received the 2017 UNESCO/Guillermo Cano World Press Freedom Prize.

Bibliography 
Hope (2010)

References

Further reading

External links 
 Website advocating his release

1964 births
Amnesty International prisoners of conscience held by Eritrea
Living people
People from Asmara
Eritrean emigrants to Sweden
Eritrean journalists
Eritrean prisoners and detainees
Swedish journalists
Swedish people imprisoned abroad
Eritrean male writers
Male journalists
Eritrean dramatists and playwrights
Male dramatists and playwrights
21st-century dramatists and playwrights
21st-century male writers